Cepheus is a constellation in the far northern sky, named after Cepheus, a king of Aethiopia in Greek mythology.  It is one of the 48 constellations listed by the second century astronomer Ptolemy, and it remains one of the 88 constellations in the modern times.

The constellation's brightest star is Alpha Cephei, with an apparent magnitude of 2.5. Delta Cephei is the prototype of an important class of star known as a Cepheid variable. RW Cephei, an orange hypergiant, together with the red supergiants Mu Cephei, MY Cephei, SW Cephei, VV Cephei, and V354 Cephei are among the largest stars known. In addition, Cepheus also has the hyperluminous quasar S5 0014+81, which hosts an ultramassive black hole in its core, reported at 40 billion solar masses, about 10,000 times more massive than the central black hole of the Milky Way, making this among the most massive black holes currently known.

History and mythology
Cepheus was the King of Aethiopia. He was married to Cassiopeia and was the father of Andromeda, both of whom are immortalized as modern day constellations along with Cepheus.

Features

Alpha Cephei, also known as Alderamin, is the brightest star in the constellation, with an apparent magnitude of 2.51.  Delta Cephei is the prototype Cepheid variable, a yellow-hued supergiant star 980 light-years from Earth. It was discovered to be variable by John Goodricke in 1784. It varies between 3.5m and 4.4m over a period of 5 days and 9 hours. The Cepheids are a class of pulsating variable stars; Delta Cephei has a minimum size of 40 solar diameters and a maximum size of 46 solar diameters. It is also a double star; the yellow star also has a wide-set blue-hued companion of magnitude 6.3.

There are three Red supergiants in the constellation that are visible to the naked eye. Mu Cephei, also is known as Herschel's Garnet Star due to its deep red colour. It is a semiregular variable star with a minimum magnitude of 5.1 and a maximum magnitude of 3.4. Its period is approximately 2 years. The star is around 5.64 AU in radius. If it were placed at the center of the Solar System, it would extend to the orbit of Jupiter. Another, VV Cephei A, like Mu Cephei, is a red supergiant and a semiregular variable star, located at least 5,000 light-years from Earth. It has a minimum magnitude of 5.4 and a maximum magnitude of 4.8, and is paired with a blue main sequence star called VV Cephei B. One of the largest stars in the galaxy, it has a diameter 1,400 times that of the Sun. VV Cephei is also an unusually long-period eclipsing binary, but the eclipses, which occur every 20.3 years, are too faint to be observed with the unaided eye. T Cephei, also a red giant, is a Mira variable with a minimum magnitude of 11.3 and a maximum magnitude of 5.2, 685 light-years from Earth. It has a period of 13 months and a diameter of between 329 to 500 solar diameters.

There are several prominent double stars and binary stars in Cepheus. Omicron Cephei is a binary star with a period of 800 years. The system, 211 light-years from Earth, consists of an orange-hued giant primary of magnitude 4.9 and a secondary of magnitude 7.1. Xi Cephei is another binary star, 102 light-years from Earth, with a period of 4,000 years. It has a blue-white primary of magnitude 4.4 and a yellow secondary of magnitude 6.5.

Kruger 60 is an 11th-magnitude binary star consisting of two red dwarfs. The star system is one of the nearest, being only 13 light-years away from Earth.

Deep-sky objects

 NGC 188 is an open cluster that has the distinction of being the closest open cluster to the north celestial pole, as well as one of the oldest-known open clusters.
 NGC 6946 is a spiral galaxy in which ten supernovae have been observed, more than in any other galaxy. It is sometimes called the Fireworks Galaxy.
 IC 469 is another spiral galaxy, characterized by a compact nucleus, of oval shape, with perceptible side arms.
 The nebula NGC 7538 is home to the largest-yet-discovered protostar.
 NGC 7023 is a reflection nebula with an associated star cluster (Collinder 429); it has an overall magnitude of 7.7 and is 1,400 light-years from Earth. The nebula and cluster are located near Beta Cephei and T Cephei.
 S 155, also known as the Cave Nebula, is a dim and very diffuse bright nebula within a larger nebula complex containing emission, reflection, and dark nebulosity.
 The quasar 6C B0014+8120 is one of the most powerful objects in the universe, powered by a supermassive black hole which is as massive as 40 billion Suns.

Visualizations

Cepheus is most commonly depicted as holding his arms aloft, praying for the deities to spare the life of Andromeda. He also is depicted as a more regal monarch sitting on his throne.

Equivalents
In Chinese astronomy, the stars of the constellation Cepheus are found in two areas: the Purple Forbidden enclosure (紫微垣, Zǐ Wēi Yuán) and the Black Tortoise of the North (北方玄武, Běi Fāng Xuán Wǔ).

Namesakes

 USS Cepheus (AKA-18) and USS Cepheus (AK-265), United States Navy ships.
 Update 3.4 "Cepheus" of the videogame Stellaris

See also
 Cepheus in Chinese astronomy

References

 
 
 Ian Ridpath and Wil Tirion (2007). Stars and Planets Guide, Collins, London. . Princeton University Press, Princeton. .

External links

 The Deep Photographic Guide to the Constellations: Cepheus
 The clickable Cepheus
 Star Tales – Cepheus
 Warburg Institute Iconographic Database (medieval and early modern images of Cepheus)

 
Constellations
Northern constellations
Constellations listed by Ptolemy